is a railway station on the Iida Line in the village of Yasuoka, Shimoina, Nagano Prefecture, Japan, operated by Central Japan Railway Company (JR Central).

Lines
Kadoshima Station is served by the Iida Line and is 107.9 kilometers from the starting point of the line at Toyohashi Station.

Station layout
The station consists of a single ground-level island platform. The station is unattended, and there is no station building, but only a waiting room on the platform.

Platforms

Adjacent stations

History
Kadoshima Station opened on 30 October 1932. With the privatization of Japanese National Railways (JNR) on 1 April 1987, the station came under the control of JR Central.

Passenger statistics
In fiscal 2016, the station was used by an average of 4 passengers daily (boarding passengers only).

Surrounding area
Tenryū River
Yasuoka Dam
Yasuoka Village Hall

See also
 List of railway stations in Japan

References

External links

 Kadoshima Station information 

Railway stations in Nagano Prefecture
Railway stations in Japan opened in 1932
Stations of Central Japan Railway Company
Iida Line
Yasuoka, Nagano